Generation was a Canadian current affairs television program which aired on CBC Television in 1965.

Premise
The program examined contemporary topics and concerns in the context of the generation gap. Issues such as careers, marriage, Quebec's Quiet Revolution, religion or tobacco were the subject of various episodes.

For most of its run, Generation was a local Toronto programme hosted by Lloyd Robertson. In mid-1965, it was broadcast nationally with selected local episodes supplemented by episodes produced from various regions. June Callwood, Katie Johnson and Bill McVean were additional hosts during the national broadcasts.

Scheduling
The half-hour program aired locally on CBLT from late 1963 until mid-1966. It was broadcast on the national CBC network Wednesdays at 10:30 p.m. (Eastern) from 4 August to 15 September 1965.

References

External links
 

CBC Television original programming
1963 Canadian television series debuts
1966 Canadian television series endings